Sheykhiabad-e Sofla (also Romanized as  Sheykhīābād-e Soflá; also known as Shaikabad, Shaikhābād, Sheykhābād-e Soflá, Sheykhīābād, and Sheykhīābād-e Pā’īn) is a village in Hojr Rural District, in the Central District of Sahneh County, Kermanshah Province, Iran. At the 2006 census, its population was 351, in 86 families.

References 

Populated places in Sahneh County